The Sand Key Bridge (also called the Clearwater Pass Bridge) is a girder bridge that crosses the Clearwater Pass, connecting Clearwater and Belleair Beach, Florida. The bridge carries Gulf of Mexico Boulevard, part of SR 699, and it was built in 1995, replacing the original bascule bridge built in the 1960s.

The bascule bridge was owned and maintained by the City of Clearwater, and current bridge and owned and maintained by the Florida Department of Transportation.

See also 

 Dunedin Causeway
 Clearwater Memorial Causeway
 Belleair Causeway
 Indian Rocks Causeway
 Park Boulevard Bridge
 Tom Stuart Causeway
 John's Pass Bridge
 Treasure Island Causeway
 Corey Causeway
 Pinellas Bayway

References 

Road bridges in Florida
Bridges in Pinellas County, Florida
Bridges completed in 1995